Última Esperanza Sound (‘Last Hope Sound’ or 'Inlet of Last Hope') is an inlet stretching from the mouth of Eberhard Fjord to the outskirts of Monte Balmaceda, within the Magallanes Basin. The navigator Juan Ladrillero named it so in 1557, because he felt it was this direction was his last chance to reach the Strait of Magellan. The inlet ends at a glacier, and not at the strait.

This inlet is tidal, and drains an extensive basin. It receives the waters of almost all the surface waters of Torres del Paine National Park through the Serrano River. The sound occupies a valley carved by glacial action. During the last glacial period glaciers reached their maximum extent in Última Esperanza Sound about 48,000 years ago. 

Last Hope Sound along with the Señoret Channel forms a navigation route, which connects Puerto Natales with several protected areas of the region. 
In the vicinity of the Eberhard Fjord is located Cueva del Milodón Natural Monument, where remains have been recovered of the extinct ground sloth along with a settlement of prehistoric humans.

See also
 Bernardo O'Higgins National Park
 Cerro Toro
 Cordillera Riesco
 Cordillera Sarmiento
 Fjord of the Mountains
 Lago Porteno

References
 Bailey Willis (1914) Argentina Dirección General de Ferrocarriles Nacionales, Argentina Comisión de Estudios Hidrológicos,Northern Patagonia: Character and Resources, Scribner press, 464 pages
 C. Michael Hogan, Cueva del Milodon, Megalithic Portal, 13 April 2008 
 
 
Abbey Mitchell (1924) Mexico district General de Nacionales, Barcelona Estudios, lodon', Megalithic Portal, 13 April 2008

Line notes

Bodies of water of Magallanes Region
Última Esperanza Province
Sounds of Chile